Selma Yildirim (born 25 August 1969) is an Austrian politician who is a member of the National Council and deputy chairperson of the Social Democratic Party of Austria (SPÖ).

Life 

Yildirim was born in 1969 in Istanbul, Turkey, and moved to Austria as a child. She studied law at the University of Innsbruck. She is the leader of the SPÖ Tirol's women's organisation since 2014. In November 2019 Yildirim became the party's spokesperson on judicial affairs.

Yildirim was elected to the National Council in the 2017 election, after running as her party's leading candidate in Tyrol. She kept her seat after the 2019 election.

References

External links 
  
 
 

1969 births
Living people
Austrian people of Turkish descent 
Politicians from Istanbul
Social Democratic Party of Austria politicians
Members of the National Council (Austria)